Lebia fuscata is a species of beetle in the family Carabidae. It is found in Canada and the United States.

References

Further reading

 
 
 
 

Lebia
Beetles described in 1825
Taxa named by Pierre François Marie Auguste Dejean